Clonguish GAA is a Gaelic football and hurling club in Newtownforbes, County Longford, Ireland. The club was formed on 20 October 1889 and was originally called Clonguish Gallowglasses. Situated in the west of Co. Longford, it is bordered by four parishes in Co. Longford, Drumlish, Killoe, Killashee and Templemichael (Longford) – the parish also shares a common boundary with the Province of Connacht in that it adjoins the parishes of Bornacoola and Gortletteragh in Co. Leitrim and Tarmonbarry in Co. Roscommon. The Irish for Clonguish is Cluain Geis which means 'The Meadow of the Swans'.

Clonguish played their games at Curry Field in the Castleforbes Estate before moving to their new ground Centenary Park in 1984. Centenary Park is now called Bertie Allen Park after one of Clonguish's and Longford's most famous GAA men. Bertie Allen Park has two full-size pitches with state of the art floodlights on the main pitch and training lights on the bottom pitch. Work has been carried out on a third pitch beside the training pitch. The facilities include four dressing rooms with showers, weights room, two meeting rooms, an indoor soccer, basketball court and handball area.

Notable players
Brendan Barden
Paul Barden
David Barden
Enda Williams

Honours

(Note 1: Clonguish won the Minor League in 1949 & 1951. No Minor Championship was played in 1949. Minor Championship of 1951 was not finished and it was decided at a County Board meeting in Feb 1952 to drop the incomplete 1951 Minor Championship as reported in the Longford Leader on 8 March 1952 in an article titled 'With the Minors').

(Note 2: Juvenile Championship changed from U-16 to U-15 from 2021, hence 2021 title was U-15 and all prior were U-16)

(Note 3: 1972 Minor Football Championship was won as an amalgamation with St. Vincents)

References

External links
Longford GAA Website
Longford Gaelic Stats

Gaelic games clubs in County Longford
Gaelic football clubs in County Longford
Hurling clubs in County Longford